The 2008 North Hertfordshire Council election was held on 1 May 2008, at the same time as other local elections across England and Wales. Of the 49 seats on North Hertfordshire District Council, 15 were up for election.

Only two seats changed party at the election, both of which were won by the Conservatives from Labour. The Conservatives therefore increased their majority on the council and their leader, F. John Smith, remained leader of the council. Whilst Labour's share of the vote increased, they were overtaken in seat numbers by the Liberal Democrats, who became the second largest party on the council. Prior to the election Labour was led by David Kearns, who was replaced after the election by Martin Stears.

Overall results
The overall results were as follows:

Ward results
The results for each ward were as follows. Where the previous incumbent was standing for re-election they are marked with an asterisk(*).

References

2008 English local elections
2008